Mordellistena bicolor is a beetle in the genus Mordellistena of the family Mordellidae. It was described in 1982 by Marianne Horak.

References

bicolor
Beetles described in 1982